Lac-Bouchette is a municipality in Quebec, Canada. The town is located on the eastern shore of the eponymous Bouchette Lake, along Quebec Route 155 and the Canadian National Railway.

In addition to Lac-Bouchette itself, the municipality also includes the population centres of Lac-des-Commissaires and Lizote.

The municipality and lake were named in honour of Surveyor General of Lower Canada Joseph Bouchette (1774-1841).

Demographics
Population trend:
 Population in 2011: 1174 (2006 to 2011 population change: -10.5%)
 Population in 2006: 1311
 Population in 2001: 1370
 Population in 1996: 1445
 Population in 1991: 1485

Private dwellings occupied by usual residents: 565 (total dwellings: 1120)

Mother tongue:
 English as first language: 0%
 French as first language: 99.2%
 English and French as first language: 0%
 Other as first language: 0.8%

References

External links

Municipalities in Quebec
Incorporated places in Saguenay–Lac-Saint-Jean